Fallbach may refer to:

Fallbach, Austria, a town in the district of Mistelbach, Lower Austria
Fallbach Waterfall, a waterfall in the Maltatal valley in the Austrian Alps
Fallbach (Inn, Baumkirchen), a river of Austria, tributary of the Inn in Baumkirchen
Fallbach (Inn, Innsbruck), a river of Austria, tributary of the Inn in Innsbruck
Fallbach (Kinzig), a river of Hesse, Germany

Fällbach, a river of Saxony, Germany